XHUNO-FM is a radio station in Aguascalientes, Aguascalientes, Mexico. It carries a contemporary hit radio format known as Magia 101.

In 2015, XHUNO was authorized for HD Radio alongside sister station XHUZ-FM.

External links
 Official website

References

Radio stations in Aguascalientes
Mass media in Aguascalientes City
Radio stations established in 1993